Blackfoot is a census-designated place along the Flatiron and Willow creeks on the Blackfeet Nation in Glacier County, Montana, United States, about  west of Cut Bank.

U.S. Route 2 passes by the southeast edge of the community.

Blackfoot is referenced throughout the Fox television drama Prison Break as a remote location where a man who is thought to be dead is hiding out.

Demographics

See also
 List of census-designated places in Montana

References

Census-designated places in Glacier County, Montana
Census-designated places in Montana
Blackfeet Nation